"Bill" Tang Ka-piu (born 29 October 1979) is a Hong Kong politician who currently served as a legislative councillor and district councillor (2007–2019).

Political career

Legislative Council
He was a member of the Legislative Council of Hong Kong for the Labour constituency between 2012 and 2016. He participated in the 2008 LegCo election with Wong Kwok-hing, representing the Hong Kong Federation of Trade Unions, the largest pro-Beijing labour union in the territory. In the 2012 LegCo election he gained a seat in the Labour constituency uncontested.

In the 2016 LegCo election, Tang ran in the New Territories East geographic constituency but was not elected.

Tang ran again in New Territories East during the 2018 by-elections, but was again not elected. It was reported that he spent approximately HK$2.24 million on this campaign, mostly on advertising and meals.

Tang ran in Kowloon East in both the postponed 2020 and 2021 Legislative Council election, and returned to the parliament after the absence of pro-democracy forces.

In August 2022, after Nancy Pelosi visited Taiwan, Tang said "China will take resolute and powerful countermeasures to protect its sovereignty and security interests."

In October 2022, Tang was unhappy that medicine made in China was listed as tier 2, whereas other countries' medicine was listed as tier 1.

In December 2022, Tang was part of 3 lawmakers who drafted legislation to reform CUHK's governing council, saying "During the anti-government turmoil in 2019, there was a riot on the campus of CUHK but the attitude and handling of the incident by CUHK were appalling."

District Councils
He was also a district councillor for the Islands District Council, representing Yat Tung Estate North. He was first elected in the 2007 election, and was re-elected in 2011 and 2015. In the 2019 District Council election he ran for a seat on Sha Tin District Council in the newly created Shui Chuen O constituency, but lost to pro-democracy candidate Lo Tak-ming of Community Sha Tin.

Property 
According to Tang's January 2022 declaration of assets, he owns a flat in Guangdong.

References

External links
 Members' Biographies Hon TANG Ka-piu

Living people
Hong Kong Federation of Trade Unions
Democratic Alliance for the Betterment and Progress of Hong Kong politicians
District councillors of Islands District
HK LegCo Members 2012–2016
HK LegCo Members 2022–2025
Hong Kong pro-Beijing politicians
Hong Kong social workers
Members of the Election Committee of Hong Kong, 2012–2017
Members of the Election Committee of Hong Kong, 2017–2021
1979 births